Thuès-Entre-Valls is a commune in the Pyrénées-Orientales department in southern France.

Geography

Localisation 
Thuès-Entre-Valls is located in the canton of Les Pyrénées catalanes and in the arrondissement of Prades.

Transports 
The Ligne de Cerdagne and its Yellow train has a station in town, named Thuès-Carança.

Population

See also
Communes of the Pyrénées-Orientales department

References

Communes of Pyrénées-Orientales